Aniceto Guterres Lopes (born April 16, 1967 in Tapo, East Timor) is an East Timorese politician and human rights lawyer.

Early life
On December 7, 1975, Lopes and his family fled the country to Builalu, Indonesia to escape from the Indonesian troops that invaded East Timor. Upon their return to East Timor a year later, the Lopes family discovered their village of Tapo was destroyed, and moved to Maliana.

Education
In 1985, Lopes studied law at the Udayana University in Bali, after obtaining a scholarship from the governor of East Timor.

Politics
While studying in Indonesia, Lopes joined the National Resistance of East Timorese Students ( (RENETIL)) in 1989. Lopes was in charge of relaying political information to and from East Timor and other parts of the world.

Career
After moving back to East Timor in 1991, Lopes worked for a NGO in Dili.

From 1992 to 1996, Lopes served as the secretary general of the East Timor Agriculture and Development Foundation (ETADEF).

Lopes began his law practice in 1996 by starting a law firm in East Timor where he represented clients in cases where human rights were violated.

Yayasan HAK
Lopes co-founded the Human Rights and Justice Foundation (Yayasan Hukum, Hak Asasi dan Keadilan, abbreviated as Yayasan HAK) in 1997, when East Timor was still ruled by Indonesian armed forces. The organization offers legal services to human rights victims, and records violations of human rights. Lopes led Yayasan HAK from 1997 to 2002.

United Nations
At a special session of the United Nations Human Rights Council in 1999, Lopes spoke about the problems he and other East Timorese were encountering during Indonesia's occupation of East Timor. Lopes explained that Indonesian supported militia destroyed his home and office in September 1999. Lopes mentioned that he had also been receiving death threats because of his position as a human rights lawyer. Lopes was sworn in as a member of the UN Transitional Administration in East Timor's Transitional Judicial Service Commission in 2002.

Truth commission work 
Lopes was named as a commissioner of the  Commission for Reception, Truth and Reconciliation in East Timor (CAVR) in 2002, during the UNTAET administration, and elected as chair of the commission. The commission lasted until 2005 and looked into cases of human rights abuse that occurred during the invasion of East Timor. He also served as a commissioner on the Indonesia–Timor Leste Commission of Truth and Friendship.

Political career 
Lopes is a member of FRETLIN, one of East Timor's major political parties. He was first elected in 2002 and would become his party's parliamentary leader. In 2017–18, when FRETILIN was in government, he was president of the National Parliament.

Accolades
In 2001, Lopes was named as a fellow of the Ashoka Innovators of the Public. Lopes was also awarded the 2003 Ramon Magsaysay Award of Emergent Leadership, for his courageous stand for justice.

References

1967 births
Living people
Presidents of the National Parliament (East Timor)
East Timorese lawyers
Ramon Magsaysay Award winners
People from Bobonaro District
Fretilin politicians